Pelargoderus luzonicus is a species of beetle in the family Cerambycidae. It was described by Stephan von Breuning in 1935, originally under the genus Epepeotes.

References

luzonicus
Beetles described in 1935